The Guilty One is a 1924 American silent mystery film directed by Joseph Henabery and written by Anthony Coldeway. The film stars Agnes Ayres, Edmund Burns, Stanley Taylor, Crauford Kent, Cyril Ring, and Thomas R. Mills. The film was released on June 8, 1924, by Paramount Pictures.

Cast  
Agnes Ayres as Irene Short
Edmund Burns as Donald Short 
Stanley Taylor as Philip Dupre
Crauford Kent as Seaton Davies
Cyril Ring	as H. Beverly Graves
Thomas R. Mills as Sam Maynard
Catherine Wallace as Bess Maynard
George Siegmann as Captain
Clarence Burton as Detective
Dorothea Wolbert as Anne

Preservation
With no copies of The Guilty One located in any film archives, it is a lost film.

References

External links

1924 films
American mystery films
1924 mystery films
Paramount Pictures films
Films directed by Joseph Henabery
American black-and-white films
American silent feature films
1920s English-language films
1920s American films
Silent mystery films